The 2021–22 Tennessee Lady Volunteers basketball team represented the University of Tennessee in the 2021–22 college basketball season. Led by former Lady Vol Kellie Harper, in her third year as head coach, the team played their games at Thompson–Boling Arena and were members of the Southeastern Conference.

Previous season
The 2020–21 team finished the season 17–8, 9–4 in third place in SEC play. They lost in the semifinals of the SEC tournament to South Carolina. They also received an at-large bid to the NCAA tournament, where they lost in the second round to Michigan.

Roster

Schedule

|-
!colspan=9 style=""| Exhibition 
 
|-
!colspan=9 style=""| Regular season

|-
!colspan=9 style=""|SEC tournament

|-
!colspan=12 style=| NCAA tournament

Rankings

^Coaches' Poll did not release a second poll at the same time as the AP.

References

Tennessee
Tennessee Lady Volunteers basketball seasons
Volunteers
Volunteers
Tennessee